Rabino may refers to:
Rąbino, a village in Świdwin County, West Pomeranian Voivodeship, Poland
Gmina Rąbino, an administrative district rural gmina in Świdwin County, West Pomeranian Voivodeship, Poland
Andrea Rabino (born 1978), former Italian sprinter
Giovanni Battista Rabino (1931-2020), Italian politician
Rabino Chandra (died 1801), Manipuri king